Southwest Gas Holdings, Inc. is an investor-owned utility based in Las Vegas, Nevada, United States.

The company provides natural gas service to over 2 million residential, commercial, and industrial customers in parts of Arizona, Nevada, and California. At the end of 2021, Southwest had 1.15 million customers located in Arizona, 0.8 million in Nevada, and 0.2 million in California.

History
The company was founded in Barstow, California, in 1931, and soon expanded to the nearby town of Victorville. Natural gas was brought into southern Nevada in 1953, and Southwest Gas began service to the burgeoning communities of Las Vegas and Henderson the following year.

On January 24, 1956, Southwest Gas Corporation became a publicly owned company. Expansion into Arizona occurred in 1957 with the acquisition of Natural Gas Service of Arizona.

In 1963, with the completion of a 250-mile pipeline in northern Nevada, the company was able to grow once again by extending its service territory to include Carson City. Several years later it began serving customers as far west as Elko in the northern part of the state. Expansion also occurred during this time in California with expansion from its Victorville operations to Big Bear.

During the next several decades the company made several more acquisitions and expanded in parts of its tri-state service territory. In 1979, the purchase of the gas system of what is now Tucson Electric Power, and the 1984 purchase of the gas system of Arizona Public Service Company, added the Phoenix area to the company's customer base. During a time of unprecedented growth in the desert Southwest, Southwest Gas was serving some of the fastest-growing areas in the country. In 2005, the company acquired service territory in South Lake Tahoe from Avista, enabling it to serve customers contiguously around Lake Tahoe in California and Nevada. The company is the largest distributor of natural gas in Arizona and Nevada.

References

External links 
 Southwest Gas website
 Southwest Gas Living
 

Natural gas companies of the United States
Companies based in Las Vegas
Energy in Nevada
Energy companies established in 1931
Non-renewable resource companies established in 1931
1931 establishments in California
American companies established in 1931
Barstow, California
Companies listed on the New York Stock Exchange
Announced mergers and acquisitions